Rostrenen is a commune in the Côtes-d'Armor department and Brittany region of northwestern France.

Geography

Neighbouring communes

Rostrenen is border by Mellionnec to the south, Plouguernevel  to the east, Kergrist-Moëlou to the north, and Glomel to the west.

Climate
Rostrenen has a oceanic climate (Köppen climate classification Cfb).

Population

In French the inhabitants of Rostrenen are known as Rostrenois.

Map

Breton language
On 13 September 2004 the municipality launched a linguistic plan as part of the Ya d'ar brezhoneg (Yes to Breton) campaign. 
In 2008, 34.5% of primary children attended bilingual schools.

See also
Communes of the Côtes-d'Armor department

References

External links

Official website 

Communes of Côtes-d'Armor